Bijnavand Rural District is a rural district (dehestan) in the Zagros District of Chardavol County, Ilam Province, Iran. At the 2006 census, its population was 8,017, in 1,670 families.  The rural district has 34 villages.

References 

Rural Districts of Ilam Province
Chardavol County